McLea Nunatak is a nunatak between Richards Nunatak and Sharks Tooth, in the Prince Albert Mountains of Oates Land, Antarctica. It was named by the Southern Party of the New Zealand Geological Survey Antarctic Expedition, 1962–63, for F. McLea, a radio operator at Scott Base who was responsible for the field party radio communications.

References

Nunataks of Oates Land